Aykan Atik (born 28 December 1971) is a retired Turkish football winger and later manager.

References

1971 births
Living people
Turkish footballers
Gençlerbirliği S.K. footballers
Kayserispor footballers
Gebzespor footballers
Kardemir Karabükspor footballers
Pendikspor footballers
Boluspor footballers
Aksarayspor footballers
Association football wingers
Turkish football managers
MKE Ankaragücü managers